The Geschwister-Scholl-Preis is a literary prize which is awarded annually by the Bavarian chapter of the Börsenverein des Deutschen Buchhandels and the city of Munich. Every year, a book is honoured, which "shows intellectual independence and supports civil freedom, moral, intellectual and aesthetic courage and that gives an important impulse to the present awareness of responsibility".

The prize is named in memory and honor of Sophie and Hans Scholl, who are collectively referred to as the Geschwister Scholl ("Scholl siblings"). It is endowed with 10,000 euros and is presented at a ceremony at the Ludwig-Maximilians-Universität in Munich.

Prize Winners 
 1980: Rolf Hochhuth: Eine Liebe in Deutschland
 1981: Reiner Kunze: Auf eigene Hoffnung
 1982: Franz Fühmann: Der Sturz des Engels
 1983: Walter Dirks: War ich ein linker Spinner?
 1984: Anna Rosmus: Widerstand und Verfolgung
 1985: Jürgen Habermas: Die neue Unübersichtlichkeit
 1986: Cordelia Edvardson: Gebranntes Kind sucht das Feuer
 1987: Christa Wolf: Störfall
 1988: Grete Weil: Der Brautpreis
 1989: Helmuth James Graf von Moltke: Briefe an Freya 1939–1945 (posthumously)
 1990: Lea Rosh/Eberhard Jäckel: Der Tod ist ein Meister aus Deutschland
 1991: Georges-Arthur Goldschmidt: Die Absonderung
 1992: Barbara Distel / Wolfgang Benz (Publ.): Dachau Booklet No. 7 Solidarität und Widerstand
 1993: Wolfgang Sofsky: Die Ordnung des Terrors - Das Konzentrationslager
 1994: Heribert Prantl: Deutschland leicht entflammbar - Ermittlungen gegen die Bonner Politik
 1995: Victor Klemperer: Ich will Zeugnis ablegen bis zum letzten. Tagebücher 1933–1945 (posthumously)
 1996: Hans Deichmann: Gegenstände
 1997: Ernst Klee: Auschwitz, die NS-Medizin und ihre Opfer
 1998: Saul Friedländer: Das Dritte Reich und die Juden
 1999: Peter Gay: Meine deutsche Frage (first published as My German Question: Growing Up in Nazi Berlin, 1998, his autobiography)
 2000: Helene Holzman: Dies Kind soll leben (posthumously)
 2001: Arno Gruen: Der Fremde in uns
 2002: Raul Hilberg: Die Quellen des Holocaust
 2003: Mark Roseman: In einem unbewachten Augenblick. Eine Frau überlebt im Untergrund
 2004: Soazig Aaron: Klaras NEIN
 2005: Necla Kelek: Die fremde Braut
 2006: Mihail Sebastian: Voller Entsetzen, aber nicht verzweifelt (posthumously)
 2007: Anna Politkovskaya: Russisches Tagebuch (posthumously)
 2008: David Grossman: Die Kraft zur Korrektur. Über Politik und Literatur
 2009: Roberto Saviano: Das Gegenteil von Tod
 2010: Joachim Gauck: Winter im Sommer – Frühling im Herbst: Erinnerungen.
 2011: Liao Yiwu: Für ein Lied und hundert Lieder. Ein Zeugenbericht aus chinesischen Gefängnissen. (engl.: For a song and one hundred songs : a poet's journey through a Chinese prison.)
 2012: Andreas Huckele v/o Jürgen Dehmers: Wie laut soll ich denn noch schreien? Die Odenwaldschule und der sexuelle Missbrauch.
 2013: Otto Dov Kulka: Landschaften der Metropole des Todes. Auschwitz und die Grenzen der Erinnerung und der Vorstellungskraft. (engl.: Landscapes of the metropolis of death : reflections on memory and imagination.)
 2014: Glenn Greenwald: No Place to Hide
 2015: Achille Mbembe: Critique de la raison nègre
 2016: Garance Le Caisne: Opération César
 2017: Hisham Matar: The Return
 2018: Götz Aly: Europa gegen die Juden. 1880–1945
 2019: Ahmet Altan: Ich werde die Welt nie wiedersehen. Texte aus dem Gefängnis
 2020: Dina Nayeri: Der undankbare Flüchtling
 2022: Andrey Kurkov: Tagebuch einer Invasion

References

External links 
All links are in German
 Geschwister-Scholl-Preis
 "Geschwister-Scholl-Preis für Neclá Kelek", Netzeitung, September 29, 2005

German non-fiction literary awards
Free expression awards
Awards established in 1980
Hans and Sophie Scholl